Horsell Common is a  open space in Horsell, near Woking in Surrey. It is owned and managed by the Horsell Common Preservation Society.

In the south-east corner of the common is the former Muslim Burial Ground, now an Islamic Peace Garden. There are Bronze Age barrows, protected heathland and thousands of trees. There are parts of the common all over Horsell, isolated from the rest of the common by roads. There is a large amount of wildlife on the common. 

The Sandpit area was the location of the first Martian landing in the H.G. Wells novel The War of the Worlds (1897) .

References

External links
Horsell Common, Horsell Common Preservation Society
Surrey County Council map of SSSIs

Woking
Sites of Special Scientific Interest in Surrey
Parks and open spaces in Surrey
Special Protection Areas in England